The yellowtail horse mackerel (Trachurus novaezelandiae), also known as the yellowtail scad, is a jack in the family Carangidae found around Australia and New Zealand at depths to 500 m. The yellowtail scad is the only member of the monotypic genus Atule and is distinguished from similar species by a well-developed adipose eyelid and finlet-like extensions of the last rays of the dorsal and anal fins. It inhabits coastal areas such as bays and coral reefs, preying on small fishes and crustaceans. The yellowtail scad is an important component of fisheries throughout its range, taken by a number of netting and hook-and-line methods. It is a prized food fish in some regions and is cooked or preserved by a variety of methods.

Description
The body profile of the yellowtail horse mackerel is a moderately compressed, oval shape body. The yellowtail horse mackerel is very similar to the greenback horse mackerel, but has 68 to 73 lateral line scutes, compared with 76 to 82 for the greenback horse mackerel. The coloration of the yellowtail horse mackerel is a bright olive green above, transitioning to a more golden green ventrally, before becoming silvery white on the underside of the fish. Nine to 16 faint grey bars run vertically on the sides of the fish, as well as a black spot slightly smaller than the eye on the upper margin of the operculum and adjacent shoulder region.

In some parts of Australia, the Yakka are prone to the parasite Cymothoa exigua which first eats and then replaces the tongue of the host fish. The parasite does not otherwise harm the fish and has no effect on humans. The parasite should however be removed before consumption.

Distribution and Habitat

They are frequently encountered on the bottom or in midwater but are only infrequently recorded near the surface, they occur in large schools. Adults are normally recorded over rocky reefs just offshore while the  juveniles prefer waters with shallow, soft substrates.

Diet
The yellowtail scad is a pelagic predator that takes a variety of small plankton and fish. The species exhibits two different feeding patterns during different stages of life, with the juveniles between 91 and 150 mm feeding mainly on crustaceans while adults over 151 mm prey almost exclusively on small fish.

Relationship to humans
This species can be sold fresh, smoked, canned and frozen; and it can be cooked by frying, broiling and baking. It is a relatively long lived species for its size, living up to 15 years, and is exploited by commercial and recreational fisheries. In New South Wales the catch per annum since 1997 has been between 300 and 500 tonnes but much of the catch is discarded or used as bait.

References

yellowtail horse mackerel
Marine fish of Southern Australia
Fish of New Zealand
Taxa named by John Richardson (naturalist)
yellowtail horse mackerel